Amanti may refer to:
Kia Opirus, a Kia car model also marketed as the Amanti
 Amanti (film), a 1968 Italian film directed by Vittorio De Sica 
Lucio Amanti (born 1977), Canadian cellist

See also
 Amantis (disambiguation)